Cinder Cone Wilderness is a 16,935-acre (6,853 ha) wilderness area in the Organ Mountains-Desert Peaks National Monument managed by the U.S. Bureau of Land Management in the U.S. state of New Mexico.  Established in 2019, this Wilderness located in the West Potrillo Mountains, contains a high concentration of cinder cones among a landscape typical of a Chihuahuan Desert ecosystem.

See also
List of U.S. Wilderness Areas

References

External links
Organ Mountains Desert Peaks National Monument Wilderness - New Mexico Wilderness Alliance

IUCN Category Ib
Wilderness areas of New Mexico
Organ Mountains–Desert Peaks National Monument
Protected areas of Doña Ana County, New Mexico
Protected areas established in 2019